Jinzhong Prison  is a prison in Jinzhong District in Shanxi province of China. It has or has had 13 jail areas. It is connected to prison enterprises. It used to be known as Shanxi Provincial No. 1 Prison.

References

See also

 Taiyuan No. 3 Prison

Prisons in China
Buildings and structures in Shanxi
Jinzhong